Dawnette Douglas (born 21 July 1971) is a Bermudian sprinter. She competed in the women's 100 metres at the 1992 Summer Olympics.

References

External links
 

1971 births
Living people
Athletes (track and field) at the 1992 Summer Olympics
Bermudian female sprinters
Olympic athletes of Bermuda
Place of birth missing (living people)
Olympic female sprinters